The 2003 London Marathon was the 23rd running of the annual marathon race in London, United Kingdom, which took place on Sunday, 13 April. The elite men's race was won by Ethiopia's Gezahegne Abera in a time of 2:07:56 hours and the women's race was won by home athlete Paula Radcliffe in 2:15:25. Radcliffe's time was a marathon world record, improving on her own record by nearly two minutes.

In the wheelchair races, France's Joël Jeannot (1:32:02) and Italy's Francesca Porcellato (2:04:21) won the men's and women's divisions, respectively. Jeannot's winning time broke the previous course record by over three minutes.

A total of 111,000 people applied to enter the race (a record high): 45,629 had their applications accepted and 32,746 started the race. A total of 32,536 runners finished the race, including 7768 women.

Results

Men

Women

Wheelchair men

Wheelchair women

References

Results
Men's results. Association of Road Racing Statisticians. Retrieved 2020-04-18.
Women's results. Association of Road Racing Statisticians. Retrieved 2020-04-18.

External links

Official website

2003
London Marathon
Marathon
London Marathon